Sweet Devil is a 1938 British musical comedy film directed by René Guissart and starring Bobby Howes, Jean Gillie and William Kendall. It was made at Pinewood Studios.

Cast
 Bobby Howes as Tony Brent  
 Jean Gillie as Jill Turner  
 William Kendall as Edward Bane  
 Syd Walker as Belton  
 Ellis Jeffreys as Lady Tonbridge  
 Glen Alyn as Sylvia Tonbridge  
 Anthony Ireland as Senor Florez 
 Hazel Terry as Rose  
 Sylvia Leslie  as Frances  
 Syd Crossley as Police Constable 
 Four New Yorkers as Specialty Act

See also
Quelle drôle de gosse! (1935)

References

Bibliography
 Low, Rachael. Filmmaking in 1930s Britain. George Allen & Unwin, 1985.
 Wood, Linda. British Films, 1927-1939. British Film Institute, 1986.

External links

1938 films
British musical comedy films
1938 musical comedy films
Films directed by René Guissart
Films shot at Pinewood Studios
Films set in London
British remakes of French films
British black-and-white films
1930s English-language films
1930s British films